The 1980 NCAA Division I men's ice hockey tournament was the culmination of the 1979–80 NCAA Division I men's ice hockey season, the 33rd such tournament in NCAA history. It was held between March 22 and 29, 1980, and concluded with North Dakota defeating Northern Michigan 5-2. The first round game was held at the home team venue while all succeeding games were played at the Providence Civic Center in Providence, Rhode Island.

Qualifying teams
The NCAA gave four teams automatic bids into the tournament. The two ECAC teams that reached the ECAC tournament final received bids as did the two WCHA co-champions. The NCAA also had the ability to add up to 4 additional teams as it saw fit and chose to include the CCHA tournament champion as well.

Format
The four automatic qualifiers were seeded according to pre-tournament finish. The ECAC champion was seeded as the top eastern team while the WCHA co-champion that finished highest in the regular season was given the top western seed. The second eastern seed was slotted to play the top western seed and vice versa. Because an at-large bid was offered to a western school they were placed in a first round game with the second western seed to determine the final semifinalist. The first round game was played at the home venue of the second seed while all succeeding games were played at the Providence Civic Center. All matches were Single-game eliminations with the semifinal winners advancing to the national championship game and the losers playing in a consolation game.

Tournament bracket

Note: * denotes overtime period(s)

First round

(W2) Minnesota vs. (A) Northern Michigan

Semifinal

(W1) North Dakota vs. (E2) Dartmouth

(E1) Cornell vs. (A) Northern Michigan

Third-place game

(E1) Cornell vs. (E2) Dartmouth

National Championship

(W1) North Dakota vs. (A) Northern Michigan

All-Tournament team
G: Steve Weeks (Northern Michigan)
D: Marc Chorney (North Dakota)
D: Tom Laidlaw (Northern Michigan)
F: Roy Kerling (Cornell)
F: Doug Smail* (North Dakota)
F: Phil Sykes (North Dakota)
* Most Outstanding Player(s)

References

Tournament
NCAA Division I men's ice hockey tournament
NCAA Division I Men's Ice Hockey Tournament
NCAA Division I Men's Ice Hockey Tournament
NCAA Division I Men's Ice Hockey Tournament
1980s in Minneapolis
Ice hockey competitions in Providence, Rhode Island
Ice hockey competitions in Minneapolis